Inquirer Bandera is a daily Taglish tabloid newspaper based in Metro Manila, Philippines. It is published by the Inquirer Publications, Inc with editorial and business offices located at the Media Resources Plaza Building, Mola cor. Pasong Tirad Streets, La Paz, Makati.

Bandera has thirteen pages and costs 10 pesos. It contains local and international news, columns by hard hitting columnists and Radyo Inquirer anchors, reader's opinions, an action line column with government agencies, Good News with Fr. Dan delos Angeles column, showbiz news, sports news and analysis, lotto results, karera tips, trivias and tips, special sections including motoring, pets, agriculture and livestock, horoscope with Madam Rosa, Bantay OCW column, and crossword and sudoku puzzles.

History
Bandera (first named as Metro Times) was first published on September 10, 1990, a brainchild of three Manila Times journalists, Ralph Chekeh, Danny Mariano and Ricky Agcaoili, with Lito Bautista as the pioneering managing editor (up to his retirement in 2014). It was then the sister newspaper of Manila Times under the Gokongwei family who acquired the broadsheet in 1989 from the Roces empire. The tabloid's first head office was located at the Manila Times Compound in Sgt. Santiago, Laging Handa, Quezon City but it was relocated to the old basement of Robinson's Supermarket in EDSA-Pioneer, Mandaluyong. English language are primarily used in its articles until they shifted to full Tagalog in the 2000s.

Regular readers of Bandera then called the tabloid a part of the x-rated tabloids due to the appearance of Rosanna Roces as the Page 3 girl, Margie Holmes (who was a Palanca awardee) and Andromeda's Erotika columns. Moralists criticized Bandera for being an obscene and vulgar publication, that led to dozens of libel cases filed and an investigation by the Mandaluyong City Council. Lotto results and analysis and horse racing tips are some of the favorite parts of the tabloid. It also had "more daring" sister tabloids, Bandera PM, Bandera Tonight, and Bandera International Edition, catered for the Filipino OFWS, which published in Hong Kong and the Middle East.

In 2000, the Prieto family, owner of PDI, acquired Bandera from the Gokongweis. During the acquisition period, it underwent smooth transition from a "mature" and "sexy" content shredding to its "wholesome" image. Bandera now had three separate editions, for Luzon, Visayas and Mindanao. It underwent experimenting new concepts, such as Compact newspaper (combination of broadsheet and tabloid without crime reports or skimpy women on frontpage) and Klik Bandera, which is the special weekend edition dedicated to showbiz news. It conquered online, thru the Inquirer Plus digital edition, where the full copy of Bandera issues can be seen online. The newspaper also has an official website, Facebook and Twitter handles and their smartphone application.

Bandera launched several corporate social responsibility works, such as the Lapis and Papel project and flag distribution to schools across the country.

See also
 Philippine Daily Inquirer
 Inquirer Libre

References

Publications established in 1990
National newspapers published in the Philippines
Newspapers published in Metro Manila
Philippine Daily Inquirer